Samia speaking people live in Western Kenya and Eastern Uganda. They are composed of several clans and their ancient economic activities include fishing in Lake Victoria and other rivers such as River Sio, crop farming (obulimi), and animal farming (obutuki).
The Samia speaking people, as widely known by other tribes, predominantly live in Busia districts (Both in Kenya and Uganda) and speak a dialect similar to the Luhya tribe in Kenya. However, on the Ugandan side there is a slight variation in the dialect spoken by the Samia of Southern Busia on the fringe of Lake Victoria and those of North Busia district closer to Tororo District. The former speak Olusamia while the latter speak Olugwe. The two dialects are difficult to differentiate by non Samia speaking people but easily discernible by the natives.and in Uganda mainly found inbusia and Namayingo district.

Culture and Music
Samia speaking people love music which is played in their various ceremonies, which include marriage (Obugole/ Obweya), funeral (amasika), veneration of ancestors (ebikuda mukutu and Enga'nyo), and wrestling (amalengo). Their musical instruments include: (a) A large violin-like wooden instrument called Adungu (b) A drum called Engalabe, covered at one end with the skin of a monitor lizard (c) A flute called Erere and (d) An instrument called Sikudi. The major traditional dances are owaro, ekworo, eboodi and esikudi. The eboodi and ekworo are love dances. Owaro and esikudi are performed when people are happy.

Clans
Samia speaking people have a number of clans, each person belongs to the father's clan. You can not marry from your clan or your mothers clan. The clans include; Bahony, Balundu, Badde, Bakoli, Bamayindi, Balwani, Batabona, Baburi, Bakhoba, Bakukhu,Bangale,Balwenge, Bahombe,Bamani,etc

History
Years before modern government, Samia people used to live in villages called Engongo which are separated by valleys and within Engongo they had Engoba. Engoba is many; one is called Olukoba. One needed a ladder-like contraption to access or leave Olukoba but the Olukoba also had specific gates. Up to today, the daily lives of Samia people are dictated by customs and traditions. For instance, a woman who loses her husband should be remarried to a brother of the deceased so that should this widow wish to bear more children, they should resemble their kin. Their diet consists of cassava bread made of sorghum or millet, often mixed with fermented cassava also called obusuma. Sometimes white stiff porridge made out of maize flour added. The food is eaten with vegetables, meat, or chicken. The Samia also largely consume gruel, rice and bananas. Samia speaking people are known to be very clever people due to frequent consumption of fresh fish. In fact non Samia speaking people often refer to them as "obusuma ne'ngeni bicha speed" meaning brown stiff porridge and fish roll down the throat very fast.

Notable people
 Moody Awori, Former Kenyan Vice President, veteran politician and business magnate.
 Aggrey Soryoyi Awori  - Politician, former International athlete, former parliamentarian and cabinet minister.
 Sam Odaka – Former Foreign Minister of Uganda (1964–1971)
 Benjamin Josses Odoki - Former Chief Justice of the Republic of Uganda, from 2001 until 2013.
 Justice James Ogoola - Lawyer, Judge and Poet. Principal Judge of the High Court of Uganda and a Justice of the COMESA Court of Justice in Lusaka, Zambia.
 Barbara Nekesa Oundo The former State Minister for Karamoja Affairs in the Ugandan Cabinet.
 Professor Fred Wabwire-Mangen - Professor of Epidemiology, Makerere University School of Public Health.

See also
Busia, Uganda
Busia, Kenya
Busia District, Uganda

References

Relevant literature
 Oscar, Akumu Brendah. "Imagery and Disability in Samia Proverbs." BA thesis, Makerere University, 2020.

External links
  Traditional Marriage Among The Samia People of Kenya

Abasonga

Luhya
Ethnic groups in Uganda
Ethnic groups in Kenya
Samia people